Two Distant Strangers is a 2020 American short film written by Travon Free and directed by Free and Martin Desmond Roe. The film examines the deaths of Black Americans during encounters with police through the eyes of a character trapped in a time loop that keeps ending in his death. Two Distant Strangers won the award for Best Live Action Short Film at the 93rd Academy Awards, marking distributor Netflix's first win in the category.

Plot
In New York City, black graphic designer Carter James tries to get home to his dog, Jeter, the morning after a first date, only to find himself trapped in a time loop in which he is repeatedly confronted in the street by a white NYPD officer, Merk. Merk wonders whether Carter is smoking a joint and wants to search his bag. Each encounter ends with Carter being killed by the police, then waking up in the bed of his date, Perri. In one version of the loop, riot police burst into Perri's apartment, mistaking it for a different apartment because the door number is hanging upside down, and shoot him there.

After 99 deaths, Carter decides to discuss the situation with Officer Merk. Carter tells him about the time loop, offering Merk evidence by correctly predicting what people around them will do next. Carter asks Merk to drive him home. The journey ends without mishap; Merk and Carter get out of the patrol car and shake hands. But as Carter turns to enter his apartment building, Merk starts applauding what he calls Carter's "noble performance", revealing that Merk remembers the previous loops too. Merk then shoots him in the back, while a pool of blood starts forming in the shape of Africa, and says "See you tomorrow, kid". Carter wakes up once more in Perri's bed.

Undeterred, Carter leaves Perri's apartment to make yet another effort to get home. As the song "The Way It Is" plays, names of Black Americans who have died in encounters with police are listed.

Cast
 Joey Badass as Carter James
 Andrew Howard as Merk, an NYPD officer
 Zaria Simone as Perri, Carter's date

Release
In March 2021, Netflix acquired the distribution rights and made the film available from April 9.

Comparisons to existing works
Two Distant Strangers has been compared to other films that share a similar premise:

 Groundhog Day for a Black Man (2016), directed by Cynthia Kao
In April 2021, Cynthia Kao posted a video on the social media site TikTok alleging that this film plagiarized a short film she had directed in December 2016 titled Groundhog Day For a Black Man. The contents of Kao's film were similar to the plot of Two Distant Strangers, which are both about a black man trying to relive the same day over and over until he can survive a police altercation. Furthermore, in 2020, during the George Floyd protests, social media news outlet NowThis contacted Kao about featuring the film on their Facebook and Instagram pages. The following year, Netflix released Two Distant Strangers in collaboration with NowThis, excluding any credit of Kao's name or that she had anything to do with the original idea for the movie in any way. NowThis responded to the claims, citing the fact that the film was independently conceived and in final production before they became involved, disputing any connection to Kao.
 Replay (2019), The Twilight Zone, Season 1, Episode 3, directed by Gerard McMurray
 The Obituary of Tunde Johnson (2019), directed by Ali LeRoi

Accolades

See also
 Black Lives Matter
 See You Yesterday (2019), Netflix film with a similar concept
 Day Break (2006), television series about a black cop who is being framed for a murder and is caught in a time loop while trying to solve the case.
 Groundhog Day (1993)
 Woke, television series similar in content
 12:01 PM (1990), Oscar-nominated short similar in content
 "Changes," 1992 song by Tupac Shakur that samples Bruce Hornsby & the Range's "The Way It Is" and lends this film its title

References
Footnotes

Citations

External links
 
 
 Official trailer
 
 

2020 short films
2020 science fiction films
2020 drama films
American science fiction drama films
Films about racism
2020 films
Films about dogs
English-language Netflix original films
Time loop films
Live Action Short Film Academy Award winners
2020s English-language films
2020s American films